Dominykas Barauskas (born 18 April 1997) is a Lithuanian professional footballer who plays as a defender for Stal Mielec and the Lithuania national team.

Club career
On 10 June 2022, Barauskas moved abroad for the first time in his career, joining Polish Ekstraklasa side Stal Mielec on a one-year deal with a one-year extension option.

On 16 July 2022, he made his league debut in a 0–2 away win against Lech Poznań.

International career
He was first called up to the Lithuania national football team in September 2020 for games against Kazakhstan and Albania, but did not play.

He made his debut on 2 September 2021 in a World Cup qualifier against the Northern Ireland that ended in a 1–4 home loss. He substituted Vaidas Slavickas in the 74th minute.

References

External links
 
 

1997 births
Footballers from Vilnius
Living people
Lithuanian footballers
Lithuania youth international footballers
Lithuania under-21 international footballers
Lithuania international footballers
Association football defenders
FK Žalgiris players
FC Stumbras players
FK Sūduva Marijampolė players
FK Riteriai players
Stal Mielec players
A Lyga players
Ekstraklasa players
Lithuanian expatriate footballers
Expatriate footballers in Poland
Lithuanian expatriate sportspeople in Poland